The Georgetown Environmental Law Review is a quarterly student-edited law review published at Georgetown University Law Center covering the legal implications of environmental issues including: climate change, renewable energy, and the intersection of the environment and international legal areas such as trade, human rights, security, and technology transfer. It was established in 1988 as the Georgetown International Environmental Law Review and obtained its current title in 2015. The first issue of each year's volume is dedicated to international issues. According to the Washington & Lee University law review rankings, the journal has an impact factor of 9.02 as of 2020.

References

External links
 

American law journals
Environmental law journals
Georgetown University academic journals
Publications established in 1988
Law journals edited by students
Georgetown University Law Center
Quarterly journals